Highway 65, also known as the Dead Sea Highway, is a north–south highway in Jordan.  It starts in Aqaba passing through Wadi Araba, and adjacent to the Dead Sea and the Jordan Valley to the western suburbs of the city of Irbid in Jordan's northern tip.

Development 
The first part of the highway was conceived in 1974 as the Safi-Aqaba Highway. After the highway had reached Safi (in 1977), further plans were developed for a Dead Sea Highway to the north. For a long time however, there was an incomplete section between Mazra'a to Zara.

Later, Highway 65 became included in the Jordanian 25-year plan to build an extensive road network which travels around the country. It involves building beltways around major cities such as Irbid, Salt or its capital, Amman. This project's road-improvement investigation is expected to reach US$1.8 billion when complete.

Tourist attractions 
This highway runs north-south from Irbid Governorate along the Dead Sea. North from the Dead Sea is a place called Potash City, down to Aqaba.

See also
 Highway 15 (Jordan)
 Highway 90 (Israel–Palestine) – the parallel road on the Israel–Palestine side of the border

References 
Nyazi Tours, Jordan
The Library - Rock of Ages: Petra, Jordan's Ancient City of Temples and Tombs
Jordan Investment Board - Transportation

Roads in Jordan